Ruaidri mac Cathal Ua Conchobair was King of Connacht in Ireland.

References

 Byrne, Francis John (2001), Irish Kings and High-Kings, Dublin: Four Courts Press, 
 Gaelic and Gaelised Ireland, Kenneth Nicols, 1972.
 The Second Battle of Athenry, Adrian James Martyn, East Galway News & Views, 2008–2009

Kings of Connacht
14th-century Irish monarchs
People from County Roscommon
Ruaidri